This is a list of all films produced by Full Moon Features. Note that this does not include any films that were produced by Charles Band prior to the creation of Full Moon, even though Full Moon now distributes some of them, such as Trancers. For a list of these pre-Full Moon productions, see Empire Pictures filmography.

Full Moon

Full Moon Productions Series 
 Puppet Master (1989)
 Meridian: Kiss of the Beast (1990)
 Shadowzone (1990)

Full Moon Entertainment Series 
 Crash and Burn (1990)
 Puppet Master II (1990)
 Dollman (1991)
 The Pit and the Pendulum (1991)
 Puppet Master III: Toulon's Revenge (1991)
 Subspecies (1991)
 Trancers II (1991)
 Bad Channels (1992)
 Demonic Toys (1992)
 Doctor Mordrid (1992)
 Netherworld (1992)
 Seedpeople (1992)
 Trancers III (1992)
 Arcade (1993)
 Bloodstone: Subspecies II (1993)
 Dollman vs. Demonic Toys (1993)
 Invisible: The Chronicles of Benjamin Knight (1993)
 Mandroid (1993)
 Puppet Master 4 (1993)
 Robot Wars (1993)
 Bloodlust: Subspecies III (1994)
 Dark Angel: The Ascent (1994)
 Lurking Fear (1994)
 Oblivion (1994)
 Puppet Master 5: The Final Chapter (1994)
 Shrunken Heads (1994)
 Trancers 4: Jack of Swords (1994)
 Trancers 5: Sudden Deth (1994)
 Castle Freak (1995)
 Demon in the Bottle (1996)
 Oblivion 2: Backlash (1996)

Full Moon Studios Series 
 Vampire Journals (1997)

Full Moon Pictures Series 
 Alien Abduction: Intimate Secrets (1996)
 Head of the Family (1996)
 Petticoat Planet (1996)
 The Creeps (1997)
 Hideous! (1997)
 Curse of the Puppet Master (1998)
 Shrieker (1998)
 Subspecies 4: Bloodstorm (1998)
 Talisman (1998)
 Blood Dolls (1999)
 The Boy with the X-Ray Eyes (1999)
 The Incredible Genie (1999)
 The Killer Eye (1999)
 Retro Puppet Master (1999)
 Totem (1999)
 Witchouse (1999)
 The Dead Hate the Living! (2000)
 Killjoy (2000)
 Prison of the Dead (2000)
 Sideshow (2000)
 Voodoo Academy (2000)
 Witchouse II: Blood Coven (2000)
 Demonicus (2001)
 Horrorvision (2001)
 Vampire Resurrection (2001)
 Witchouse 3: Demon Fire (2001)
 Groom Lake (2002)
 Hell Asylum (2002)
 Jigsaw (2002)
 Killjoy 2: Deliverance from Evil (2002)
 Speck (2002)
 Trancers 6 (2002)

Full Moon Features Series 
 Bleed (2002)
 Birth Rite (2003)
 Darkwalker (2003)
 Deadly Stingers (2003)
 Delta Delta Die! (2003)
 Puppet Master: The Legacy (2003)
 Dr. Moreau's House of Pain (2004)
 Tomb of Terror (2004)
 The Baker's Dozen (2005)
 Decadent Evil (2005)
 Doll Graveyard (2005)
 The Gingerdead Man (2005)
 Horrific! (2005)
 Monsters Gone Wild (2005)
 The Possessed (2005)
 Urban Evil (2005)
 When Puppets and Dolls Attack (2005)
 Aliens Gone Wild (2005)
 Evil Bong (2006)
 Petrified (2006)
 Dangerous Worry Dolls (2007)
 Dead Man's Hand (2007)
 Decadent Evil II (2007)
 Deadly End (2008)
 Gingerdead Man 2: Passion of the Crust (2008)
 Evil Bong 2: King Bong (2009)
 Skull Heads (2009)
 Demonic Toys 2 (2010)
 Killjoy 3 (2010)
 Puppet Master: Axis of Evil (2010)
 Evil Bong 3D: The Wrath of Bong (2011)
 Gingerdead Man 3: Saturday Night Cleaver (2011)
 The Dead Want Women (2012)
 DevilDolls (2012)
 Killer Eye: Halloween Haunt (2012)
 Killjoy Goes to Hell (2012)
 Puppet Master X: Axis Rising (2012)
 Gingerdead Man vs. Evil Bong (2013)
 Ooga Booga (2013)
 Unlucky Charms (2013)
 The Dead Reborn (2013)
 Trophy Heads (2014)
 Evil Bong 420 (2015)
 Evil Bong: High-5! (2016)
 Killjoy's Psycho Circus (2016)
 Ravenwolf Towers (2016)
 Puppet Master: Axis Termination (2017)
 Evil Bong 666 (2017)
 Evil Bong 777 (2018)
 Weedjies: Halloweed Night (2019)
 Necropolis: Legion (2019)
 Corona Zombies (2020)
 Barbie & Kendra Save the Tiger King (2020)
 Blade: The Iron Cross (2020)
 Barbie & Kendra Storm Area 51 (2020)
 Femalien: Cosmic Crush (2020)
 The Resonator: Miskatonic U (2021)
 The Gingerweed Man (2021)
 Don't Let Her In (2021)
 Cassex (2021)
 Baby Oopsie (2021)
 The Seduction of Rose Parrish (2021)
 Famous T&A 2 (2022)
 Attack of the 50 foot Cam Girl (2022)
 Evil Bong 888: Infinity High (2022)
 Piranha Women (2022)
 Baby Oopsie 2: Murder Dolls (2022)
 Femalien: Starlight Saga (2022)
 Giantess Battle Attack (2022)
 Baby Oopsie 3: Burn Baby Burn! (2022)
 Puppet Master: Doktor Death (2022)
 Sorority Babes in the Slimeball Bowl-O-Rama 2 (2022)
 12 Slays of Christmas (2022)

 Sub-labels 

 Moonbeam Entertainment 
 Prehysteria! (1993)
 Remote (1993)
 Beanstalk (1994)
 Dragonworld (1994)
 Pet Shop (1994)
 Prehysteria! 2 (1994)
 Josh Kirby... Time Warrior: Chapter 1, Planet of the Dino-Knights (1995)
 Josh Kirby... Time Warrior: Chapter 2, the Human Pets (1995)
 Josh Kirby... Time Warrior: Chapter 3, Trapped on Toyworld (1995)
 Josh Kirby... Time Warrior: Chapter 4, Eggs from 70 Million B.C. (1995)
 Leapin’ Leprechauns! (1995)
 Magic Island (1995)
 Prehysteria! 3 (1995)
 Josh Kirby... Time Warrior: Chapter 5, Journey to the Magic Cavern (1996)
 Josh Kirby... Time Warrior: Chapter 6, Last Battle for the Universe (1996)
 Spellbreaker: Secret of the Leprechauns (1996)
 Magic in the Mirror (1996)
 Magic in the Mirror: Fowl Play (1997)
 Mystery Monsters aka Goobers (1997)
 Johnny Mysto: Boy Wizard (1997, Video)
 The Secret Kingdom (1998)
 The Shrunken City (1998)
 Clockmaker aka Timekeeper (1998, TV Movie)
 The Search for the Jewel of Polaris: Mysterious Museum (1999)
 Phantom Town (1999, Video)
 Aliens in the Wild, Wild West (1999, Video)
 Shapeshifter aka Shifter (1999)
 Teenage Space Vampires (1999)
 Planet Patrol (1999, Video)
 Teen Sorcery (1999, Video)
 Teen Knight aka Medieval Park (1999, TV Movie)
 The Boy with the X-Ray Eyes (1999)
 Excalibur Kid (1999, Video)
 Task Force 2001 (2000, Video)

 Torchlight Entertainment 
 Beach Babes from Beyond (1993)
 Test Tube Teens from the Year 2000 (1994)
 Beach Babes 2: Cave Girl Island (1995)
 Blonde Heaven (1995)
 Huntress: Spirit of the Night (1996)
 Petticoat Planet (1996)
 Lurid Tales: The Castle Queen (1997)

 Monster Island Entertainment 
 Zarkorr! The Invader (1996)
 Kraa! The Sea Monster (1998)

 Filmonsters! 
 Frankenstein Reborn! (1998)
 The Werewolf Reborn! (1998)

 Alchemy Entertainment/Big City Pictures 
 Ragdoll (1999)
 The Horrible Dr. Bones (2000)
 The Vault (2000)
 Cryptz (2002)

 Edge Entertainment 
 Freeway II: Confessions of a Trickbaby (1999)
 Dying to Get Rich! (2000)
 Gun: Fatal Betrayal (2000)

 Delirium Films 
 It Knows You're Alone (2021)
 Scream of the Blind Dead'' (2021)

References

Lists of films by studio